Myrna Simpson (born 1970) is a Canadian research chemist who is the Canada Research Chair in Integrative Molecular Biogeochemistry at the University of Toronto. She is also Director of the Environmental Nuclear Magnetic Resonance Centre. Her research consider the molecular level mechanisms that underpin environmental processes, and the development of advanced analytical tools to better understand environmental health.

Early life and education 
Simpson became interested in chemistry at high school. She completed undergraduate studies in chemistry at the University of Alberta. After graduating, she spent a year as an analytical chemist. She became particularly interested in environmental chemistry, and eventually returned to and graduate studies at the University of Alberta. Her doctoral research considered sorption of organic compounds in soil.

Research and career 
Simpson has argued that nuclear magnetic resonance spectroscopy is of particular value when it comes to environmental research. In particular, it can be used to understand the fate of environmental pollutants and how particular ecosystems respond to climate change. In 2003, she secured funding from the Canada Foundation for Innovation to purchased Canada's first high-field NMR spectrometer for environmental research. The high-field NMR spectrometer was installed in 2007.

Awards and honours 
 2003 University of Alberta Horizon Award
 2015 International Union of Soil Sciences PM Huang Award
 2017 University of Toronto Scarborough Faculty Research Excellence Scholar
 2020 Appointed Canada Research Chair
 2021 Royal Society of Chemistry Analytical Division Horizon Prize Sir George Stokes Award

Selected publications

References 

Canadian chemists
University of Alberta alumni
Academic staff of the University of Toronto
Soil scientists
1970 births
Living people